Minna Thomas Antrim (October 13, 1861, Philadelphia – 1950) was an American writer. She is famous for the remark "Experience is a good teacher, but she sends in terrific bills."

Life and career
Born in Philadelphia, the daughter of William Preston Thomas and Lauretta Robbins, Minna Thomas was educated at St. Mary's Hall in Burlington, New Jersey and in 1878 was married to Mr. W. H. Antrim (an editor) in Philadelphia. She was well known for her collection of toasts (1902) as well as for her books for children like Don'ts for Girls and Don'ts for Boys.

Works
Dont's for Girls: A Manual of Mistakes, 1902
Naked Truth and Veiled Allusions, 1901
The Wisdom of the Foolish & the Folly of the Wise, 1903
Phases Mazes and Crazes of Love, 1904
Mimic's Calendar, 1904 
At the sign of the golden calf, 1905
Knocks Witty Wise "and"___, 1905
Sweethearts and Beaux, 1905
Don'ts for Bachelors and Old Maids, 1908
Jester Life and his Marionettes, 1908

Notes

External links
 

1861 births
1950 deaths
Doane Academy alumni